The Socialist Labour Party's results in general elections are as follows.

United Kingdom elections

Summary of general election performance

By-elections 1996–1997

1997 General Election results

By-elections 1997–2001

2001 general election results

By-elections 2001–2005

2005 general election results 

The Party managed to get its highest percentage share in any individual parliamentary constituency at the 2005 general election when it gained 14.2% of the votes cast in Glasgow North East.

By-elections 2005–2010

2010 general election results 

The Socialist Labour Party ran 23 candidates in the 2010 general election, who received a total of 7,196 votes, fewer than 0.1% of the UK national vote. All lost their deposits. The best results were those of Kai Andersen in Liverpool West Derby (614 votes - 1.7%) and Ken Capstick in Barnsley East (601 votes - 1.6%). In the local elections held on the same day, Andersen also received 244 votes 
(4.2%) in the Croxteth ward of Liverpool.

By-elections 2010–2015

2015 general election results

2017 general election results

2019 general election results

European Parliament

1999 European elections

2009 European elections

2014 European elections

Scottish Parliament

1999 Scottish Parliament election

By-Elections 1999–2003

2003 Scottish Parliament election

2007 Scottish Parliament election

2011 Scottish Parliament election

National Assembly for Wales

1999 Welsh Assembly election

2003 Welsh Assembly election

2007 Welsh Assembly election
The Socialist Labour Party stood throughout every region in Wales and managed to qualify for its first Welsh Assembly electoral broadcast. Its votes had dropped by 0.1% in the three regions which it contested in 2003.

2011 Welsh Assembly election
The Socialist Labour Party stood throughout every region in Wales and managed to beat the British National Party in four regions out of the entire election and the Greens in two regions. Its vote went up by 1.2% giving it 2.4% of the national vote in 7th place pushing the BNP into 8th place.

By-Elections 2011–2016

References 

Socialist Labour Party (UK)
Election results by party in the United Kingdom